Sivaraj Ramseshan (10 October 1923 – 29 December 2003) was an Indian scientist known for his work in the field of crystallography. Ramaseshan served as director of the Indian Institute of Science and was awarded the Padma Bhushan. Ramaseshan is the nephew of Indian scientist and Nobel laureate Sir C. V. Raman and cousin of Subramanyan Chandrasekhar.

Early life

Ramaseshan was born on 10 October 1923, in Madras to Sitalakshmi, sister of Indian scientist Sir C. V. Raman. He had his schooling in Nagpur and started his forays into science as a research student under his uncle, Sir C. V. Raman.

As scientist

On completion of his doctorate, Ramaseshan joined the Indian Institute of Science as a lecturer. During this time, he developed an interest in X-ray crystallography and was instrumental in improving the material science division in  the National Aerospace Laboratories. Ramaseshan also taught as a professor in the Indian Institute of Technology.

Positions held

In 1979, Ramaseshan was appointed joint-director of the Indian Institute of Science and in 1981 became its director. He served as the director of IISc from 1981 to 1984, as president of the Indian Academy of Sciences (1983–1985), and honorary distinguished professor emeritus at the Raman Research Institute (1984–2003).

Awards
In 1966, Ramaseshan was awarded the Shanti Swarup Bhatnagar Award. This was followed by the Vasvik Award in 1980 and the INSA Aryabhata Medal in 1985. Ramaseshan is also a recipient of the Padma Bhushan.

Publications
Ramaseshan co-authored a biography of his uncle, C. V. Raman, with Raman himself and also edited two collections of Raman's writings.

Death
Ramaseshan died on 29 December 2003, at the age of 80. He was survived by his wife, Kausalya, who was a great-granddaughter of V. S. Srinivasa Sastri, and by three daughters.

References

External links
 
 

1923 births
2003 deaths
Directors of the Indian Institute of Science
Recipients of the Padma Bhushan in science & engineering
Indian crystallographers
Chandrasekhar family
Scientists from Chennai
20th-century Indian physicists